The Private Lives of Elizabeth and Essex, for a time also entitled Elizabeth the Queen, is a 1939 American historical romantic drama film directed by Michael Curtiz and starring Bette Davis, Errol Flynn, and Olivia de Havilland. Based on the play Elizabeth the Queen by Maxwell Anderson—which had a successful run on Broadway with Lynn Fontanne and Alfred Lunt in the lead roles—the film fictionalizes the historical relationship between Queen Elizabeth I and Robert Devereux, 2nd Earl of Essex. The screenplay was written by Norman Reilly Raine and Aeneas MacKenzie.

It was the fifth of nine films that Flynn and de Havilland starred in, while it was the second of his three with Davis.

The supporting cast included Donald Crisp, Henry Daniell, Henry Stephenson, and Vincent Price. The score was composed by Erich Wolfgang Korngold, who later used a theme from the film in his Symphony in F sharp major. The Technicolor cinematography was by Sol Polito, and the elaborate costumes were designed by Orry-Kelly.

The film was a Warner Bros. Pictures production, and became the hit the studio had anticipated and returned a handsome profit. Among the film's five Academy Award nominations was a nomination for Best Color Cinematography. Bette Davis was tipped to receive an Academy Award nomination for her role; however, she was nominated for Dark Victory (also from Warner) instead.

Plot
The Earl of Essex (Errol Flynn) returns in triumph to London after having dealt the Spanish a crushing naval defeat at Cadiz. In London, an aging Queen Elizabeth (Bette Davis) awaits him with love, but also with fear, because of his popularity with the commoners and his consuming ambition. His envious rivals include Sir Robert Cecil (Henry Daniell), Lord Burghley (Henry Stephenson), and Sir Walter Raleigh (Vincent Price). His only friend at court is Francis Bacon (Donald Crisp).

Instead of the praise he expects, Essex is stunned when Elizabeth criticizes him for his failure to capture the Spanish treasure fleet as he had promised. When his co-commanders are rewarded, Essex protests, precipitating a break between the lovers. He leaves for his estates.

Elizabeth pines for him but refuses to degrade herself by recalling him. But when Hugh O'Neill, 2nd Earl of Tyrone (Alan Hale, Sr.) revolts and routs the English forces in Ireland, the Queen has the excuse she needs to summon Essex. She intends to make him Master of the Ordnance, a safe position at court. However, his enemies goad him into taking command of the army to be sent to quash the rebellion. 
 
Essex pursues Tyrone, though his letters to Elizabeth begging for much-needed men and supplies go unanswered. Unbeknownst to him, his letters to her, and hers to him, are being intercepted by Lady Penelope Grey (Olivia de Havilland), a lady-in-waiting who loves him herself. Finally, Elizabeth, believing herself to be scorned, sends him orders to disband his army and return to London. Furious, Essex ignores it, orders a night march, and thinks he has finally cornered his foe. However, at a parley, Tyrone points out the smoke rising from the English camp, signifying the destruction of the food and ammunition the English army needs. Essex accepts Tyrone's terms; he and his men disarm and sail back to England.

Thinking he has been betrayed, he leads his army in a march on London to seize the crown for himself. Elizabeth offers no resistance to his forces, but once alone with him, convinces him that she will accept the kingdom's joint rule. He then naively disbands his army and is quickly arrested and condemned to death.

The day of his execution, Elizabeth can wait no longer. She summons him, hoping he will abandon his ambition in return for his life (which she is eager to grant). However, Essex tells her that he will always be a danger to her and walks to the chopping block.

Cast

In credits order
 Bette Davis as Queen Elizabeth
 Errol Flynn as Earl of Essex
 Olivia de Havilland as Lady Penelope Gray
 Donald Crisp as Francis Bacon
 Alan Hale, Sr. as Earl of Tyrone (as Alan Hale)
 Vincent Price as Sir Walter Raleigh
 Henry Stephenson as Lord Burghley
 Henry Daniell as Sir Robert Cecil
 James Stephenson as Sir Thomas Egerton
 Nanette Fabray as Mistress Margaret Radcliffe (as Nanette Fabares)
 Ralph Forbes as Lord Knollys
 Robert Warwick as Lord Mountjoy
 Leo G. Carroll as Sir Edward Coke
 Guy Bellis as Lord Charles Howard (uncredited)
 Forrester Harvey as bit part (uncredited)
 Holmes Herbert as Majordomo (uncredited)
 I. Stanford Jolley as Spectator outside Whitehall Palace (uncredited)

Production

Sources
The film was based on the stage play by Maxwell Anderson, Elizabeth the Queen, which had premiered on Broadway in 1930 starring Lynn Fontanne and Alfred Lunt.

Film re-titling
The title of the film was originally to be the same as the play, but Flynn demanded his presence be acknowledged in the title. However, the new title, The Knight and the Lady, upset Davis, who felt it gave the male lead more importance than her and was, to her mind, essentially "a woman's story." She sent at least two telegrams in April and June 1938 to studio president Jack L. Warner demanding that the title include the character of Elizabeth by name and before the character of Essex, or she would refuse to make the film. Elizabeth and Essex, one of Davis's preferred titles, was already under copyright as the title of a book written by Lytton Strachey. In the end, the studio acquiesced and gave the film the title it bears today, mirroring the titles of earlier historical films such as The Private Life of Henry VIII and The Private Life of Don Juan.

On-screen partnership of Davis and Flynn
Davis recounted later in life her difficulties in making the film. She had been very enthusiastic about the challenge of playing Elizabeth (in 1955, she would play her as an old woman in The Virgin Queen). She had lobbied for Laurence Olivier to play the part of Essex, but Warner Brothers, nervous at giving the part to an actor who was relatively unknown in the United States, instead cast Errol Flynn, who was at the height of his success. Davis felt he was not equal to the task, and also believed from past experience that his casual attitude to his work would be reflected in his performance. For her own part, she studied the life of Elizabeth, worked hard to adopt a passable accent, and shaved her hairline to achieve a greater resemblance. Many years later, however, Davis viewed the film with her friend, Olivia de Havilland. At the film's end, Davis turned to de Havilland and admitted, "I was wrong, wrong, wrong. Flynn was brilliant!"

Flynn and Davis, born respectively in 1909 and 1908, were almost the same age (30 and 31 in 1939), in contrast to the age gap of more than 30 years between Elizabeth and Essex in real life. Davis was also less than half the age the real Elizabeth had been at the time of the events depicted, which was 63.

A final scene of Essex on the execution block was cut after previews.

Reception

Box office
The film made a profit of $550,000.

According to Warner Bros figures the film earned $955,000 domestically and $658,000 foreign.

Critical
The public liked Flynn's charming rogue of a character, his undisguised Tasmanian accent notwithstanding, but the critics found him to be the weak link in the production, with The New York Times writing, "Bette Davis's Elizabeth is a strong, resolute, glamour-skimping characterisation against which Mr. Flynn's Essex has about as much chance as a beanshooter against a tank."

Footage from the movie was re-used in The Adventures of Don Juan (1948).

In the years between Flynn's death and the release of the film on videocassette and its first showings on cable television, the title was changed to Elizabeth the Queen. The current title was restored some years later.

Awards
The film was nominated for five Academy Awards:
 Best Art Direction (Anton Grot)
 Best Cinematography (Color) (Sol Polito, W. Howard Greene)
 Music (Scoring) (Erich Wolfgang Korngold)
 Sound Recording (Nathan Levinson)
 Special Effects (Byron Haskin, Nathan Levinson)

The film is recognized by American Film Institute in these lists:
 2002: AFI's 100 Years...100 Passions – Nominated
 2005: AFI's 100 Years of Film Scores – Nominated

References

 Stine, Whitney and Davis, Bette : ''Mother Goddam.  Virgin Books. 1974

External links

 
 
 
 
 
 1952 Best Plays radio adaptation of original play Elizabeth the Queen at Internet Archive
 1945 Theatre Guild on the Air radio adaptation of original play Elizabeth the Queen at Internet Archive

1939 films
1930s color films
American biographical drama films
Films directed by Michael Curtiz
Films scored by Erich Wolfgang Korngold
Warner Bros. films
Films set in Tudor England
1939 romantic drama films
Films about capital punishment
Films about Elizabeth I
Cultural depictions of Walter Raleigh
Plays by Maxwell Anderson
American romantic drama films
Films produced by Hal B. Wallis
1930s biographical drama films
1930s English-language films
1930s American films